Fire Maidens from Outer Space (US: Fire Maidens of Outer Space) is a 1956 British independent black-and-white science fiction feature film. It was written, produced and directed by American filmmaker Cy Roth as a collaboration between Cy Roth Productions and Great Britain's Criterion Films, and distributed in the UK by Eros Films and in the USA by Topaz Film Co.. The film stars Anthony Dexter as the lead astronaut, Susan Shaw as a "fire maiden" who befriends him, Paul Carpenter as the expedition captain, and Jacqueline Curtis as the "fire maiden" leader. There were 13 additional "fire maidens". The music score features cues excerpted from the opera Prince Igor by Alexander Borodin.

Many film critics have dubbed the film the "worst movie ever made".

Plot
The discovery of an earth-like atmosphere on the 13th moon of Jupiter leads to the sending of a crew of five male astronauts, armed with handguns, to investigate. On the moon, they rescue Hestia, a beautiful girl, who is being attacked by a monster. They subsequently discover New Atlantis, a dying civilization, a remnant of the original Atlantis who escaped when that continent sank. There are only seventeen people left, all women save for a single elderly man, Prasus, whom the girls revere as "father". Prasus hopes the spacemen will stay and help him destroy the monster, which is a slender, male hominid creature, around six feet tall with dark, pitted skin, impervious to bullets, and described as a "man with the head of a beast".

Luther Blair learns from Hestia, however, that Prasus rules New Atlantis as a tyrant and wants to keep the earthmen there to mate with the girls. Duessa, one of the women, overhears Blair and Hestia conspiring to escape and encourages the other fire maidens to bind her and sacrifice her.  The monster, which lurks outside the city's walls, breaks into the city and kills Prasus along with Duessa. It is killed by the earthmen, and the remaining women decide to let them return to earth. Hestia returns with them, and the astronauts promise to send spaceships back with husbands for the rest.

Production
The Monthly Film Bulletin review credits Lito Carruthers as editor, and Scott MacGregor as assistant director. However, MacGregor is credited onscreen as production and art supervisor, John Pellatt receives screen credit as assistant director, and Lito Carruthers is credited as Lighting Cameraman (Director of Photography). The actor playing the creature wears dark, tight-fitting clothing without clearly visible zippers, but with cork-blackened hands and feet and a grotesque dark head mask which appears to have been modeled on Rondo Hatton. Carruthers' contribution to the film has not been confirmed.

Cast
 Anthony Dexter as Luther Blair
 Susan Shaw as Hestia
 Paul Carpenter as Capt. Larson
 Jacqueline Curtis as Duessa
 Harry Fowler as Sydney Stanhope
 Sydney Tafler as Dr. Higgins
 Owen Berry as Prasus
 Rodney Diak as Anderson
 Maya Koumani as Fire Maiden
 Richard Walter as The Creature
 Norma Arnould as Fire Maiden
 Sylvia Burrows as Fire Maiden
 Ann Elsden as Fire Maiden
 Marcella Georgius as Fire Maiden
 Corinne Gray as Fire Maiden

Reception and reputation
In a contemporary review of Fire Maidens from Outer Space (1956), The Monthly Film Bulletin stated: "Even the most dedicated connoisseurs of the artless are likely to find this British attempt at science-fiction something of a strain on their patience."

From retrospective reviews, Halliwell's Film and Video Guide describes the film as "a strong contender for the title of the worst movie ever made, with diaphanously clad English gals striking embarrassed poses against cardboard sets". In Phil Hardy's book Science Fiction (1984), a review described the film as "a bottom-of-the barrel piece of British Science Fiction", and that "the film's one claim to fame is its extensive use of classical music (mostly Borodin) as background music, a trick that Stanley Kubrick deployed with far more aplomb in 2001 - A Space Odyssey". The DVD Talk website stated Fire Maidens from Outer Space "may be among the worst-ever professionally produced science fiction films" 

In November 1992, Fire Maidens of Outer Space was featured as an episode of the movie-mocking television show Mystery Science Theater 3000.

See also
 List of films considered the worst

References

Bibliography

 Hardy, Phil. Science Fiction. New York: Morrow, 1984. .
 Walker, John, ed. Halliwell's Film and Video Guide 2000. London: HarperCollins, 1999. .
 Warren, Bill. Keep Watching the Skies: American Science Fiction Films of the Fifties, 21st Century Edition. (Greatly expanded edition) Jefferson, North Carolina: McFarland & Company, 2009. .

External links
 
 Fire Maidens from Outer Space at Trailers from Hell

1956 films
British science fiction films
1950s science fiction films
Films about astronauts
Jupiter in film
Fiction set on Jupiter's moons
1950s English-language films
Films directed by Cy Roth
1950s British films
British black-and-white films